The Japanese School of Rotterdam (Rotterudamu Nihonjin Gakkō) is a Japanese international school in Hillegersberg, Rotterdam.

The Hague-Rotterdam Japanese Saturday School (ハーグ・ロッテルダム日本語補習授業校 Hāgu Rotterudamu Nihongo Hoshū Jugyō Kō), a Japanese Saturday school formed in 1996 by the merger of existing Saturday schools in The Hague and Rotterdam, holds its classes at the Rotterdam Japanese day school. The Saturday school rents from the day school and has done so since 2003.

See also
 Japanese expatriates in the Netherlands
 The Japanese School of Amsterdam
 Japan–Netherlands relations
Hillegersberg

References

External links

 The Japanese School of Rotterdam 
 English page

Schools in Rotterdam
Rotterdam
Rotterdam